Green Springs National Historic Landmark District is a national historic district in Louisa County, Virginia noted for its concentration of fine rural manor houses and related buildings in an intact agricultural landscape. The district comprises  of fertile land, contrasting with the more typical poor soil and scrub pinelands surrounding it.

Description
The district is located 1.5 miles (2 km) north of Interstate 64 from exit No. 136, "Zion Crossroads." The district is roughly bounded by U.S. Route 15 and Virginia Routes 22 and 613. The area is named for a natural spring noted by Thomas Jefferson as possessing "some medicinal virtue." The district features a mixture of wooded and farmed lands.  Its distinguishing geological feature is the presence of a heavy clay soil that retains plant nutrients and moisture, creating an open landscape suitable for farming.  The area is noted for its park-like views, particularly from U.S. Route 15.

Preservation
The district was preserved following attempts by the state of Virginia to build a prison there, and after a strip mine was proposed in the area to mine clay for cat litter.

The strip mine happened anyway (Google Earth maps of the area clearly show the destruction caused by the mine) but not on the scale that was intended originally and a great many significant houses and lands continue to be preserved and excluded from the development that is transforming some of the area around the district.

National Register properties
Significant places listed individually on the National Register of Historic Places include: 
 Boswell's Tavern, an important meeting place during the American Revolution and a well-preserved example of a Colonial-era tavern.
 Grassdale, an Italianate villa built in 1861 by the Morris family, later home of Rear Admiral David W. Taylor and his wife Imogene Morris Taylor.
 Green Springs, a late 18th-century house built by the Morris family near the springs that lent their name to the district.
 Hawkwood, an Italianate villa designed by prominent New York architect Alexander Jackson Davis for Richard Overton Morris, completed in 1855, gutted by fire in 1982.
 Ionia, a late 18th-century -story frame house, original seat of the Watson family
 Westend, a temple-fronted plantation house with extant dependencies, built by the Morris family.

Major historic properties
Major historic properties in the district include:
 Barton House is an early 19th-century -story frame house built by the Barton family.
 Belle Monte is a Federal style two-story house built in the early 18th** century and enlarged in both the 19th and 20th century. (**The Historic American Buildings Survey listed the house built in the 19th century but pulled that data from a National Historic Register Nomination Form filled out in error) There are multiple historic references to the original builder of the house and family being born at the residence prior to the 1790s as well as land transfers predating the 1780s and a reference to Belle Monte in a letter from Thomas Jefferson. Lafayette stayed at and used the house as a recuperative hospital for his soldiers. There is definite precedence that places the original structure in the early to mid-1700s. Belle Monte is in close proximity to Boswell's Tavern and built in the same era.
 Berea Baptist Church is an 1857 Gothic Revival church established in 1795.
 Bracketts is a two-story frame house built about 1800.
 Corduroy is a circa 1850 two-story frame house with a hipped roof and a single-story entrance portico.
 Eastern View is a two-story frame house with a hipped roof and Moorish-style porches, built in 1856.
 Galway is a two-story frame house with a hipped roof and a balustraded Tuscan porch.  Its eaves feature a scalloped cornice.
 Kenmuir is a -story frame house built about 1855. The house shows Gothic Revival influence with its lancet windows in the gables.
 Oakleigh is a two-story late 19th century frame house with a bracketed cornice and a full-width veranda on the front featuring sawn detailing.
 Prospect Hill is an 18th-century house that was progressively enlarged in the 19th and 20th centuries. The two-story frame house features a two-level porch on two sides, along with dependent structures.
 Quaker Hill is a small one-story frame house dating to circa 1820.
 St. John's Chapel located at the intersection of Route 640 (East Jack Jouett Road) and Route 617 (East Green Springs Road) in Louisa County.  The chapel was completed in 1888.
 Sylvania was built in 1746 by the Morris family. The two-story frame house has a hipped roof with a cross gable, with wings to either side and an ell to the rear. Sylvania was extensively damaged by a tornado on October 13, 2011, which blew the roof off the house.
 Westlands is an Italianate two-story brick house, built around 1856.

Other properties
Other historic properties include:
 Ashleigh is a 1900 frame house of two stories with a large veranda.
 Aspen Hill is a two-story late-19th century frame house with a lancet gable window.
 Fair Oaks is a two-story frame house built about 1900 with an Ionic Classical Revival veranda.
 Green "K" Acres (Oakleigh) is a late 19th-century two-story frame house with a veranda.
 Hard Bargain is a Stick Style two-story frame house with an irregular plan and a veranda.
 Hill House is a 1918 two-story frame house.
 Midloch is a circa 1900 two-story frame house with paneled chimneys and a large veranda.
 Mill View is a -story frame house dating to the late 18th century, with a two-story addition.
 Peers House is an 1857 two-story frame house with a hipped roof and a cross gable. A second Peers House was built in the late 19th century with sawn ornament on its two-story porch.
 Sunny Banks is an 1888 two-story Queen Anne Victorian frame house featuring foundation to roof front bay windows.
 Sunny View was built about 1900. It is a two-story frame house with a large veranda.

The district also includes the village of Poindexter at the intersection of Virginia Routes 613 and 640.

Status
On May 30, 1974, the district was declared a National Historic Landmark. These allow the NPS to own development rights to the land, and to ensure its continuing rural and agricultural nature. The district is an affiliated area of Shenandoah National Park. The National Park Service does not provide any facilities in the district.

See also
List of National Historic Landmarks in Virginia
National Register of Historic Places listings in Louisa County, Virginia

References
 The National Parks: Index 2001–2003. Washington: U.S. Department of the Interior.

External links

 Official NPS website: Green Springs
 Green Springs Historic District NHL information
 Barton House, Near Route 15, Boswells Tavern vicinity, Louisa, VA at the Historic American Buildings Survey (HABS)
 Ashleigh (Main House), Route 22 vicinity, Gordonsville vicinity, Louisa, VA at HABS
 Beau Allyn, Route 22 vicinity, Gordonsville, Orange County, VA at HABS
 Belle Monte (Main House), Route 22 vicinity, Gordonsville vicinity, Louisa, VA at HABS
 Bracketts Farm (Main House), Routes 638 & 640 vicinity, Trevilians vicinity, Louisa, VA at HABS
 East View, Near Route 613, Trevilians vicinity, Louisa, VA at HABS
 Ferncliff Farm, Tenant House, Route 613 & South Anna Bridge vicinity, Trevilians, Louisa County, VA at HABS
 Galway, Near Routes 22 & 636, Gordonsville, Orange County, VA at HABS
 Glen Burnie (Main House), Route 613, Trevilians, Louisa County, VA at HABS
 Green "K" Acres, Route 617, Gordonsville vicinity, Louisa, VA at HABS
 Hard Bargain (Main House), Near Routes 695, 636 & 613 vicinity, Trevilians vicinity, Louisa, VA at HABS
 Kenmuir (Main House), Route 613, Trevilians vicinity, Louisa, VA at HABS
 Mill View (Main House), Near Route 613, Trevilians vicinity, Louisa, VA at HABS
 Mill View, Barns, Route 613 vicinity, Trevilians, Louisa County, VA at HABS
 Mill View, Ice House, Route 613 vicinity, Trevilians, Louisa County, VA at HABS
 Misty Meadows, Near Routes 613 & 607 Intersection, Trevilians, Louisa County, VA at HABS
 Prospect Hill (Main House), Near Routes 613 & 607 Intersection, Trevilians vicinity, Louisa, VA at HABS
 Quaker Hill (Main House), Route 613, Trevilians vicinity, Louisa, VA at HABS
 Quaker Hill, Barn & Shed, Route 613, Trevilians, Louisa County, VA at HABS
 Sunny Banks (Main House), Near Route 640, Trevilians vicinity, Louisa, VA at HABS
 Sunny Banks, Barn No. 1, Near Route 640, Trevilians, Louisa County, VA at HABS
 Sunny Banks, Barn No. 2, Near Route 640, Trevilians, Louisa County, VA at HABS

Houses on the National Register of Historic Places in Virginia
Historic American Buildings Survey in Virginia
Federal architecture in Virginia
Italianate architecture in Virginia
Geography of Louisa County, Virginia
National Historic Landmarks in Virginia
Protected areas established in 1974
National Register of Historic Places in Louisa County, Virginia
Houses in Louisa County, Virginia
Historic districts on the National Register of Historic Places in Virginia